Michael Fakuade (born February 18, 1989) is an American-Nigerian basketball player who plays for Kagoshima Rebnise of the Japanese B.League.

College career
Fakuade played his first three seasons with Northern Illinois Huskies men's basketball team. In 2010, he transferred to UIS Prairie Stars.

Professional career
Fakuade was on the Zamalek roster for the 2021 BAL season, where the team won the first-ever BAL championship. He scored a game-high 15 points in the 2021 BAL Finals.

On September 20, 2021, Fakuade signed with Egyptian club Al Ahly to play in the 2021 Arab Club Basketball Championship. He went on to win the club's first Arab championship with Al Ahly.

After a stint with Alba Fehérvár in Hungary, Fakuade returned to Al Ahly in September 2022.

On December 23, 2022, Fakuade signed with Kagoshima Rebnise of the Japanese B.League.

BAL career statistics

|-
|style="text-align:left;background:#afe6ba;"|2021†
|style="text-align:left;"|Zamalek
| 6 || 0 || 18.7 || .538 || .312 || .583 || 4.7 || .7 || .7 || .3 || 11.3
|- class="sortbottom"
| style="text-align:center;" colspan="2"|Career
| 6 || 0 || 18.7 || .538 || .312 || .583 || 4.7 || .7 || .7 || .3 || 11.3

Awards and accomplishments

Club
Zamalek
BAL champion: (2021)
Al Ahly
Arab Club Championship: (2021)

Individual
GLVC All-First Team: (2012)
GLVC All-Defensive Team: (2012)

External links

References

ETB Wohnbau Baskets players
Força Lleida CE players
Palencia Baloncesto players
Gipuzkoa Basket players
1989 births
Orléans Loiret Basket players
Champagne Châlons-Reims Basket players
CB Breogán players
Kagoshima Rebnise players
Living people
Northern Illinois Huskies men's basketball players
American men's basketball players
Nigerian men's basketball players
Power forwards (basketball)
Zamalek SC basketball players
Al Ahly basketball players